Valerie Christine Smith (born 29 July 1965) is an international lawn bowler from New Zealand.

Bowls career

World Championships
Smith won a bronze medal at the 2004 World Outdoor Bowls Championship in Leamington Spa before winning three medals four years later at the 2008 World Outdoor Bowls Championship in the singles and pairs gold medal and team event (silver medal) in Christchurch, New Zealand. In 2016 she won a bronze medal in the fours at the 2016 World Outdoor Bowls Championship in Christchurch with Angela Boyd, Katelyn Inch and Kirsten Edwards.

In 2020 she was selected for the 2020 World Outdoor Bowls Championship in Australia.

Commonwealth Games
Smith competed at the 2006 Commonwealth Games in Melbourne, the women's triples competition and at the 2010 Commonwealth Games in Delhi, where she won a silver medal in the women's singles competition. She competed at the 2014 Commonwealth Games as part of the women's pairs and women's fours teams. She won a bronze medal in the women's fours events alongside teammates Mandy Boyd, Selina Goddard and Amy McIlroy.

She was selected as part of the New Zealand team for the 2018 Commonwealth Games on the Gold Coast in Queensland. In 2022, she competed in the women's triples and the Women's fours at the 2022 Commonwealth Games. In both the triples and the fours she secured a bronze medal.

Asia Pacific
Smith has won seven medals at the Asia Pacific Bowls Championships including four golds, the latest gold being at the 2019 Asia Pacific Bowls Championships in the Gold Coast, Queensland.

National
In addition to her international successes Smith has won six titles at the New Zealand National Bowls Championships. She won the pairs four times in 2004 and 2011 (with Jo Edwards) and 2019 and 2021 (with Lisa Prideaux) and the fours in 2010 and 2017.

References

External links 
 
 
 
 

1965 births
Living people
New Zealand female bowls players
Commonwealth Games silver medallists for New Zealand
Commonwealth Games bronze medallists for New Zealand
Commonwealth Games medallists in lawn bowls
Bowls players at the 2006 Commonwealth Games
Bowls players at the 2010 Commonwealth Games
Bowls players at the 2014 Commonwealth Games
Bowls players at the 2018 Commonwealth Games
Bowls players at the 2022 Commonwealth Games
Bowls World Champions
Medallists at the 2010 Commonwealth Games
Medallists at the 2014 Commonwealth Games
Medallists at the 2022 Commonwealth Games